José Ribeiro da Silva can refer to:
José Cláudio Ribeiro da Silva (1957–2011), Brazilian conservationist and environmentalist
José Leonardo Ribeiro da Silva (born 1988), Brazilian footballer